Manthorpe is a small village in the South Kesteven district of Lincolnshire, England.

The village is part of the Toft with Lound and Manthorpe  civil parish. At the western side of the village runs the East Glen River.

At Bowthorpe Park Farm is the Bowthorpe Oak, with the largest girth in the UK.

References

External links

 "The Bowthorpe Oak", Homepages.which.net

Villages in Lincolnshire
South Kesteven District